Al-Taliea Sport Club, is an Iraqi football team based in Baghdad, that plays in the Iraq Division Two.

Managerial history
 Ali Wali

See also
 2020–21 Iraq FA Cup

References

External links
 Al-Taliea SC on Goalzz.com
 Iraq Clubs- Foundation Dates

2019 establishments in Iraq
Association football clubs established in 2019
Football clubs in Baghdad